Savareh (also Romanized as Savāreh; also known as Savāreh-ye Bālā) is a village in Meshgin-e Sharqi Rural District, in the Central District of Meshgin Shahr County, Ardabil Province, Iran. At the 2006 census, its population was 153, in 38 families.

15 km towards Ardabil, after the village of Korbulaq, it is located on the left side and in the tourist area of Kapez. The people of this village are mostly engaged in animal husbandry and agriculture, and most of the orchards of this Rosna are apples, peaches and nectarines. This village has tourist attractions. Among them are Kepez, Samad Darsi, Delik Dash and Suyogh Bolaq, and many ancient artifacts from the ancient period can be seen in abundance in this village.

The people of this village are composed of 3 clans named Ivatli, Mughanlu and Chachikli, and the elders and elders of these clans are: Ali Ebadi, Mughanli: Hasan Rahor and Chachikli: Havar Nemati.

The water rights of this village rotate between 12 people and its water source is supplied from two springs that flow in the north and south sides.

The amenities of this village include piped drinking water, gas, electricity and telephone.

Among the famous ancient Atha of this village is Shaitan Tepe

Tepe Shaitan Tepe Si belongs to the Sassanid period and this work was registered as one of the national works of Iran on January 12, 2006 with registration number 20330.

References 

Towns and villages in Meshgin Shahr County